Pagano may refer to:

 Pagano (surname), including a list of people with the name
 Pagano (Milan Metro), a rapid transit stop in Milan, Italy
 A kit car originally designed by Ockelbo-Lundgren
 Pagano (wrestler), Mexican professional wrestler
Pagano della Torre (d. 1365), patriarch of Aquileia